Blair is an unincorporated community in Livingston County, Illinois, United States.

References

Unincorporated communities in Livingston County, Illinois
Unincorporated communities in Illinois